Kəbirli or Kebirli or Kyabirli may refer to:
 Kəbirli, Aghjabadi, Azerbaijan
 Kəbirli, Beylagan, Azerbaijan
 Kəbirli, Tartar, Azerbaijan